Simon Pettersson (born 3 January 1994) is a Swedish athlete specialising in the discus throw. He represented his country at the 2017 World Championships finishing eleventh in the final and the 2018 European Championships finishing fourth in the final. 

His personal best in the event is 70.42 metres set in Norrköping, Sweden in August 2022, at the Swedish championship where he also won gold medal. Earlier in his career he competed in the decathlon.

Pettersson competed at the 2020 Summer Olympics, winning the silver medal with a throw of 67.39 metres.

International competitions

References

1994 births
Living people
Swedish male discus throwers
World Athletics Championships athletes for Sweden
Athletes (track and field) at the 2020 Summer Olympics
Medalists at the 2020 Summer Olympics
Olympic silver medalists in athletics (track and field)
Olympic silver medalists for Sweden
Olympic athletes of Sweden
21st-century Swedish people